Carl Heinrich von Siemens (often just Carl von Siemens) (3 March 1829 – 21 March 1906) was a German entrepreneur.

He was born in Menzendorf, Mecklenburg, one of the fourteen children of a tenant farmer of the Siemens family, an old family of Goslar, documented since 1384. He was a brother of Ernst Werner von Siemens and William Siemens, sons of Christian Ferdinand Siemens (31 July 1787 – 16 January 1840) and wife Eleonore Deichmann (1792 – 8 July 1839). They had two more brothers, Hans Siemens (1818–1867) and Friedrich August Siemens (December 8, 1828-May 24, 1904), married and father to Friedrich Carl Siemens (6 January 1877 – 25 June 1952 in Berlin), married on May 22, 1920 in Berlin to Melanie Bertha Gräfin Yorck von Wartenburg (1 February 1899 in Klein Oels – 15 May 1950 in Berlin) (the parents of Heinrich Werner Andreas Siemens (born 28 September 1921) Annabel Siemens (born 3 May 1923), Daniela Siemens (born 31 July 1926) and Peter Siemens (born 8 November 1928).

In 1853, Carl Siemens traveled to St. Petersburg where he established the branch office of his brothers company Siemens & Halske. Siemens had a contract for constructing the Russian telegraph network at the time.

Carl went to Britain in 1869, where he assisted his brother William. In the 1880s, he returned to Russia before he became the senior chief executive of Siemens & Halske after the death of his brother Werner in 1892. He resigned in 1904.

For his service to Russia, he was ennobled by Tsar Nicholas II in 1895.
His grave is preserved in the Friedhof III der Jerusalems- und Neuen Kirchengemeinde (Cemetery No. III of the congregations of Jerusalem's Church and New Church) in Berlin-Kreuzberg, south of Hallesches Tor. He died in Menton, France.

References

Shaping the Future. The Siemens Entrepreneurs 1847–2018. Ed. Siemens Historical Institute, Hamburg 2018, .
Martin Lutz: Carl von Siemens 1829–1906. A life between Family and World Firm. Munich 2013, .

External links 
Lifelines: Carl von Siemens. Vol. 2, ed. Siemens Historical Institute, Munich 2014

1829 births
1906 deaths
19th-century German people
Businesspeople from Mecklenburg-Western Pomerania
German industrialists
Prussian nobility
People from the Grand Duchy of Mecklenburg-Schwerin
Carl Heinrich
German expatriates in Russia